Underground Secrets is a 1991 Swedish drama film directed by Clas Lindberg. Lindberg won the award for Best Screenplay and was nominated for Best Director at the 27th Guldbagge Awards.

Cast
 Ulf Eklund as Doctor
 Gösta Ekman as Carson
 Anna-Yrsa Falenius as Nurse
 Jenny Fogelquist as Sjuksköterskeleven
 Gunnel Fred as Nisse's mother
 Robert Gustafsson as Young Man
 Weiron Holmberg as Janitor
 Oliver Loftéen as Nisse
 Olof Rhodin as Robinson
 Kristina Törnqvist as Nurse Sara
 Max Vitali as Lelle
 Bojan Westin as Nurse
 Hans Wigren as Nisse's father
 Kim Åström as Nurse's Assistant
 Marie Öhrn as Fritidsfröken

References

External links
 
 

1991 films
1991 drama films
Swedish drama films
1990s Swedish-language films
Films directed by Clas Lindberg
1990s Swedish films